Acianthera oligantha is a species of orchid.

oligantha